Stanka Božović, née Mugoša (born 17 November 1962) is a former Yugoslav and Austrian handball player.  

Stanka Mugoša was born in Podgorica, Yugoslavia (actually Montenegro). After playing for Budućnost Titograd and Belinka Olimpija Ljubljana, she went in 1989 to the Austrian handball club Hypo Niederösterreich where she played 13 years and won 7 times the EHF Champions League. She also played for ESBF Besançon (2001-2002), Verona (2002), Nit-Hak (Norway), Tulln, Landhaus and Stockerau.

In 1990, she started to play for Austrian national team. She competed at the 1992 Summer Olympics, where Austria placed 5th. She also participated at the 2000 Summer Olympics. She stopped playing for Austria in 2000 after 220 caps and 910 goals.

She's the mother of Austrian handballer Janko Božović.

References

External links

1962 births
Living people
Sportspeople from Podgorica
Austrian female handball players
Olympic handball players of Austria
Handball players at the 1992 Summer Olympics
Handball players at the 2000 Summer Olympics